Airtel Super Singer 4, the fourth season of Airtel Super Singer, premiered on 4 February 2013. The show was a reality-based Indian singing competition in Tamil that aired on STAR Vijay. It was designed to be a talent hunt to find the best voice of Tamil Nadu. Judges for the auditions were Ananth Vaidyanathan, S.P. Sailaja, Devan Ekambaram, Nithyasree Mahadevan, Mahathi, Pop Shalini, S. Sowmya, Mano and Malgudi Subha. Some of these judges along with other noted musicians reappeared as Guest judges. To name a few- S. Janaki, M. S. Viswanathan, A. R. Rahman, P. Susheela, Asha Bhosle, S. P. Balasubrahmanyam, Vairamuthu, L. R. Eswari and Vani Jairam. Judges for the main competition were Sujatha, Unnikrishnan and Srinivas. Ma Ka Pa Anand and Bhavana were the hosts for the show. The voice trainer was Ananth Vaidyanathan. The show aired weekdays from Monday to Friday at 9PM IST.

Auditions
The auditions for the show were held at three zones, Trichy, Kovai and Chennai in December 2012 and January 2013. Thousands of applicants aged above 16 participated in the zonal auditions. The judges for the preliminary auditions included eminent singers from the music industry and popular contestants from the previous seasons of the show.  The show premiered in February 2013 featuring the audition phases from various zones.

Direct finalists
 Diwakar 
 Parvathy
 Syed Subahan

Wild card round winners
 Sarath Santhosh
 Sonia Aamod

Finalists
 Diwakar(winner)
 Parvathy
 Syed Subahan
 Sarath Santhosh 
 Sonia Aamod

Grand Finale
The final contest to decide the winner of the show was held at Sun Palm Driving Range & Golf Academy, Guindy and was telecast live on television and internet on 1 February 2014. Winners were selected by audience poll. Votes could be cast through SMS, IVR and online. After two performances by each contestant, Diwakar was declared as the winner and received an apartment worth Rs. 60 Lakhs as prize. Syed Subahan was declared as Judges Choice Winner for the best performance in Grand Finale and 1st runner-up as he got the second maximum votes of audience. Syed got 1 kg of Gold for 1st runner-up. The second runner-up Sarath Santhosh received Rs. 10 Lakhs. The other two contestants Sonia Aamod and Parvathy received Rs.5 Lakhs each.

Many prominent singers were present at the venue. Legendary singer S. Janaki was the chief-guest for the event. Ma Ka Pa Anand Prinyanka and Bhavana hosted the show.

Elimination chart

References

External links
 

Star Vijay original programming
2013 Tamil-language television series debuts
2013 Tamil-language television seasons
Tamil-language singing talent shows
Tamil-language reality television series
Tamil-language television shows
2014 Tamil-language television series endings
Television shows set in Tamil Nadu
Airtel Super Singer seasons